Giuseppe De Vita (born 4 June 1982) is an Italian rower. He competed at the 2004 Summer Olympics and the 2008 Summer Olympics.

References

1982 births
Living people
Italian male rowers
Olympic rowers of Italy
Rowers at the 2004 Summer Olympics
Rowers at the 2008 Summer Olympics
Rowers from Naples